The Sun Ba Power Corporation is an independent power producer company in Taiwan.

History
The Sun Ba Power Corporation was established on 29 August 2000. On 19 August 2004, the company was listed as public company.

Business
The company involves with the business of generation, transmission and distribution of electricity. It is affiliated with Taiwan Cogeneration Corporation, a publicly traded company with active interests in the transmission of electricity, and Taiwan Sugar Corporation, a private company with active interests in the production and distribution of sugar.

Power plants
 Sun Ba Power Plant in Shanshang District, Tainan

See also

 Electricity sector in Taiwan
 List of power stations in Taiwan

References

External links
  

Electric power companies of Taiwan
Energy companies established in 2000
Taiwanese companies established in 2000